National Highway 125 (NH 125) is a  National Highway in India. This highway connects Jodhpur, Balesar, Dechu, Pokaran in the state of Rajasthan.

References

External links
 NH 125 on OpenStreetMap

National highways in India